The Battle of Carberry Hill took place on 15 June 1567, near Musselburgh, East Lothian, a few miles east of Edinburgh, Scotland. A number of Scottish lords objected to the rule of Mary, Queen of Scots, after she had married the Earl of Bothwell, who was widely believed to have murdered her previous husband Lord Darnley. The Lords were intent to avenge Darnley's death. However, Bothwell escaped from the stand-off at Carberry while Queen Mary surrendered. Mary abdicated, escaped from prison, and was defeated at the battle of Langside. She went to exile in England while her supporters continued a civil war in Scotland.

The conflict
In May 1567 Queen Mary of Scotland married James Hepburn, 4th Earl of Bothwell. Many of the Queen's allies who previously supported her, including Maitland, Morton, Balfour, and Murray of Tullibardine, disapproved of this and chose to oppose her. Many of the same Lords who claimed disapproval in June had signed the Ainslie Tavern Bond only two months earlier in April, pledging support for the marriage.

In April, Bothwell, along with several others, had been accused of Lord Darnley's murder. Bothwell was acquitted of the charge. His chief prosecutor, Lord Darnley's father, the Earl of Lennox, failed to appear at the trial despite multiple summons. His 3,000 troops were turned back when confronted by Bothwell's 4,000, and then Lennox chose not to appear. Scottish law of the time prohibited an accuser from bringing armed troops to a trial. Many Scottish nobles disputed the trial verdict, and James Murray, brother of the Laird of Tullibardine, offered to duel with Bothwell or prove the guilt of Darnley's murder on Bothwell's henchmen. Despite this very public dissent, Mary made Bothwell the Duke of Orkney and Marquis of Fife on 12 May 1567, then married him three days later. On 11 June 1567 Bothwell's enemies assembled in armour in Edinburgh, with a printed proclamation of their intention to deliver the Queen, revenge Darnley's murder, and preserve the Prince.

Stand-off at Carberry Hill
With only the support of the Hamiltons, Queen Mary and Bothwell left Fa'side Castle on the morning of 15 June 1567 and took position on the nearby field of battle at Carberry Hill against her enemies, the rebel Confederate Lords. Mary's army, according to John Knox, took their position at Carberry Hill in an entrenchment made by the English for the Battle of Pinkie twenty years before. They were armed with cannon and pole-arms brought from Dunbar Castle. According to a letter sent to the Archbishop of Glasgow, the Queen had 200 "hagbutters" commanded by Captains Alexander Stewart and Hew Lauder of her royal guard.  Seven or eight cannon were brought from Dunbar Castle to defend the Queen's position at the "auld fort" by Fawside Castle. Bothwell's men had also brought 300 pikes from the armoury at Dunbar. After the surrender these weapons were captured and dispersed, and in September 1567 the Scottish Privy Council wrote to the villages around Carberry asking for their return.

The Confederate Lords approached from Musselburgh with an army of equal force. David Calderwood wrote they were 2,000 but with only a few "harquebusiers" who were volunteers from Edinburgh. Knox, with local knowledge, wrote that they rounded the hill to get an easier ascent and make an approach from Carberry village without the sun in their eyes. At first during this manoeuvre Mary's army thought the Confederate Lords were bypassing them and fleeing to Dalkeith.  The stand-off lasted from 11 o'clock in the morning till 5 o'clock in the afternoon. With the armies marshalled against each other, the French ambassador tried to negotiate, and received from the Earl of Morton his firm resolution to fight against the murderer of Lord Darnley. Bothwell's first action was to fire his cannon at cavalry 'prickers' who tried to draw the Queen's party out to fight.

Queen Mary's supporters carried the banner of the Lion of Scotland; the rebel Lords' banner replicated the murder scene showing Darnley dead under a tree with the infant James VI, with the motto, "Judge and Revenge my cause, O Lord." This banner had been flown as a flag at Edinburgh castle.

Bothwell offered single combat to any of the Confederate Lords. William Kirkcaldy accepted the challenge,  but Bothwell would not fight him as he was merely a baron. He also refused Murray of Tullibardine, and then Lord Lindsay. It was hot and Queen Mary's supporters had nothing to drink. The day dragged on. Two of Bothwell's supporters, Edmund Blackadder and the laird of Wedderburn, understanding that Bothwell was intending to leave, made their apologies to the Queen and rode away. In response to an oath made by the rebel Lords, Queen Mary agreed to surrender to Kirkcaldy.  He led her horse by the bridle down from the hill, while Bothwell rode off to Dunbar Castle with 25 horsemen. A drawing of the battlefield sent to London with a newsletter survives and gives a schematic idea of the events.

When William Drury, Marshall of Berwick sent a drawing of the Confederate Lord's banner and the plan to London, he added this postscript:"The Queen's apparel in the field was after the fashion of the women of Edinburgh, in a red petticoat, sleeves tied with points a "partlyte," a velvet hat and muffler. She used great persuasions and encouragements to her people to have tried it by battle. For welcome the Lords showed her the banner with the dead body, which seeing they say that she wished she had never seen him. The banner was hanged out before her window at the Provost's house (in Edinburgh), wherewith she seemed much offended. George Buchanan wrote that Mary surrendered "dressed only in a short shabby robe, that scarcely reached below her knee." Mary had left her more elaborate outfit in a chest at Fawside Castle: a black dress sewn with grains of jet, a crimson coat and cloak, and her gold and silver embroidered hat.

Queen and King's men
According to the later chronicle called The Historie of James the Sext, Queen Mary's supporters at Carberry were George Seton, 7th Lord Seton, Lord Hay of Yester, Lord Borthwick, John Cockburn of Ormiston, Home of Wedderburn, Blackadder of Tulliallan, and Cockburn of Langtoun.

The Confederate Lords included the Regent Morton, John Erskine, Earl of Mar, Alexander Cunningham, 5th Earl of Glencairn, the Lords Lindsay, William Ruthven, 1st Earl of Gowrie, Alexander Home, 5th Lord Home, Lord Sempill, Lord Sanquhar, and the lairds William Murray of Tullibardine, Douglas of Drumlanrig, Kirkcaldy of Grange and all their horsemen and foot soldiers.

Aftermath
The rebel Lords took Queen Mary to Edinburgh and then, betraying their oath at Carberry Hill, imprisoned her in Lochleven Castle, near Kinross, where her keeper was Sir William Douglas, half brother to James Stewart, 1st Earl of Moray. William Kirkcaldy was infuriated at the rebel Lords' betrayal of the oath, which he had represented to her in good faith. According to George Buchanan the spy Ninian Cockburn raced to the French court with news of Mary's capture. On the way he overtook her ambassador, William Chisholm, Bishop of Dunblane, who was ignorant of Mary's defeat, and upstaged him in front of Charles IX of France and Catherine de Medici.

Queen Mary remained in prison for eleven months while accusations continued by the Lords who deposed her at Carberry Hill. Bothwell obtained a ship and first went to Shetland, where he was helped by Olave Sinclair. He evaded Murray of Tullibardine and William Kirkcaldy whose ship the Lion ran aground. Then he crossed the sea to Norway, captivity, and madness.

Mary escaped from Lochleven and made for Dumbarton Castle in the west of Scotland. She was drawn into battle at Langside and defeated. Mary sought safety in England, became a closely watched captive, and was executed in 1587. In Scotland, her supporters continued a civil war for the next five years.

External links
Contemporary drawing of the battle, UK National Archives
Carberry from Marie-Stuart.co.uk
Carberry from AboutScotland.com
Carberry from TheReformation.info
Calendar State Papers, Foreign Elizabeth, vol.8, July 1567, (British History Online)

Footnotes

Conflicts in 1567
Battles involving Scotland
16th-century Scottish clan battles
1567 in Scotland
History of East Lothian
Mary, Queen of Scots